Yamina is a given name. Notable people with the name include:

 Yamina Bachir (born 1954), Algerian film director and screenwriter
 Yamina Benguigui (born 1955), French film director and politician
 Yamina Halata (born 1991), Algerian judoka
 Yamina Méchakra (1949–2013), Algerian novelist and psychiatrist

Arabic feminine given names